Henry Keith may refer to:

Henry Keith, Baron Keith of Kinkel (1922-2002), Scottish judge
Harry Keith, Henry George Keith, (1899-1982) British Conservator of Forests in North Borneo